Mr. Dynamite is a 1941 American crime film directed by John Rawlins and written by Stanley Rubin. The film stars Lloyd Nolan, Irene Hervey, J. Carrol Naish, Robert Armstrong, Ann Gillis, Frank Gaby and Elisabeth Risdon. The film was released on March 1, 1941, by Universal Pictures.

Plot

Cast        
Lloyd Nolan as Tommy N. Thornton aka Mr. Dynamite
Irene Hervey as Vicki Martin
J. Carrol Naish as Professor
Robert Armstrong as Paul
Ann Gillis as Joey aka Abigail
Frank Gaby as Valla
Elisabeth Risdon as Achilles
Shemp Howard as Abdullah
Cliff Nazarro as Little Man
Monte Brewer as Skinnay

References

External links
 

1941 films
American crime films
1941 crime films
Universal Pictures films
Films directed by John Rawlins
American black-and-white films
1940s English-language films
1940s American films